Manchalloor is a village situated near Pathanapuram in Kollam District, Kerala state, India. Manchalloor is a part of Pathanapuram Grama panchayat, Block panchayat and Kollam district Panchayat.

Politics
Manchallor is a part of Pathanapuram assembly constituency in Mavelikkara (Lok Sabha constituency). Shri. K. B. Ganesh Kumar is the current MLA of Pathanpuram. Shri.Kodikkunnil Suresh is the current member of parliament of Mavelikkara.

Geography
Manchalloor is a small village on the border of Pathanapuram and Thalavoor panchayats. It is divided by the Kallada River. Manchalloor is a junction in the Pathanapuram-Kottarakkara road. It connects places Kundayam, Nedumparampu, etc. Pidavoor bridge is a main landmark of Manchalloor.

Demographics
Malayalam is the native language of Manchalloor.

Schools
The schools in Manchalloor includes

Devi Matha English Medium School

Gallery

References

Geography of Kollam district
Villages in Kollam district